, known professionally as Yuta, is a Japanese singer, actor, and radio host based in South Korea. He is a member of the South Korean boy group NCT, debuting in the group's second fixed sub-unit NCT 127 in 2016 and in the group's first rotational sub-unit NCT U in 2020.

Early life 
Yuta was born on October 26, 1995, in Kadoma, Osaka, Japan. He has an older sister and a younger sister. He graduated from Yashima Gakuen University International High School. Yuta played soccer from ages five to 16 and wanted to become a professional footballer, a dream he gave up to pursue a career as an idol.

Career

2011–2015: Pre-debut activities 
Yuta became interested in an idol career in 2011 after watching TVXQ on television. He attended multiple auditions despite not having any background in singing or dancing. In 2011, he participated in an audition program, Juice Winter Collection. In 2012, he participated in SM Entertainment's first global audition without the permission of his parents and was one of three out of 10,000 participants to pass. When he was 16, he participated in a month-long training camp in Seoul during the summer. On December 23, 2013, he was introduced as a member of SM Rookies, a pre-debut team of trainees under SM Entertainment.

As part of the SM Rookies program, in August 2014, Yuta appeared on Exo 90:2014, an Mnet-produced show starring label mates Exo, where they danced to K-pop songs from the '90s, and participated in the music video remake of H.O.T.'s "Hope" and Jo Sung-mo's "Do You Know". In July 2015, Yuta appeared as the Japanese representative on Abnormal Summit, a show with a panel of non-Korean men residing in South Korea, debating Korean culture but left the show to focus on his debut in December 2015.

2016–2019: Debut with NCT 127 
In April 2016, he starred in the first season of the reality show NCT Life, which focused on the SM Rookies and their journey to their debut. In July 2016, he debuted as a member of NCT 127 with their first extended play, NCT #127.

From November 2016 to January 2017, he appeared on TV Chosun's Idol Party, in which comedians Park Mi-sun  and Lee Bong-won become a family, adopting him and Sorn of CLC as their children. He hosted the Chuseok special episode of the 2019 Idol Star Athletics Championships alongside Leeteuk, Dahyun, Johnny, Jaehyun and Mark.

2020–Now: NCT 2020, radio program and acting 
In September 2020, NCT's two-part second studio album, NCT 2020 Resonance, was announced. He appeared on the tracks "Dancing In The Rain", "Faded In My Last Song", "From Home", "Work It" and "Raise the Roof". On November 24, 2020, it was announced that Yuta would host a two-month weekly radio program, NCT 127  YUTA at Home, on InterFM897 to promote NCT 127's second Japanese EP, Loveholic, in Japan, which topped the Oricon Albums Chart. On March 19, 2021, it was announced that the broadcast would be extended and converted into a regular program.

Since 2021, Yuta appeared in numerous Japanese magazines such as PMC, Ginger, Numéro Tokyo, GQ Japan, and Elle Japan. On June 2021, a Tom Ford Neroli Portofino endorsement with Yuta was announced through Vogue Japan YouTube channel. In September 2022, Yuta made his acting debut in the film High&Low The Worst X (Cross). In October 2022, Yuta was featured on Forbes Japan 30 Under 30 list. In March 2023, it was announced that he was cast in the live-action adaptation of the web manga Play It Cool, Guys, which will be broadcast on April 14.

Filmography

Film

Television program

Television series

Radio

Bibliography

Photobooks

References

External links 

 Yuta at SM Town

1995 births
Living people
Japanese male pop singers
Japanese expatriates in South Korea
Musicians from Osaka Prefecture
People from Kadoma, Osaka
NCT (band) members
SM Entertainment artists
Japanese male dancers
Japanese dance musicians
21st-century Japanese male singers
21st-century Japanese singers
Korean-language singers of Japan
Japanese K-pop singers
Japanese male film actors